"The Story of an Hour" is a short story written by Kate Chopin on April 19, 1894. It was originally published in Vogue on December 6, 1894, as "The Dream of an Hour". It was later reprinted in St. Louis Life on January 5, 1895, as "The Story of an Hour".

The title of the short story refers to the time elapsed between the moments at which the protagonist, Louise Mallard, hears that her husband, Brently Mallard, is dead, and then discovers that he is alive after all. Featuring a female protagonist who feels liberation at the news of her husband's death, "The Story of an Hour" was controversial by American standards in the 1890s.

Plot
"The Story of an Hour" follows Louise Mallard, the protagonist with heart disease, as she deals with the news that her husband, Brently Mallard, has died. Louise's sister, Josephine, informs her of her husband's tragic death in a railroad accident. Louise reacts with immediate grief and heads to her room where she gradually comes to the realization that she is happy that her husband has died. Though she bore no animosity towards her husband, the implications of his death include a new sense of freedom for Louise. This realization of possibility is the source of her joy and "she breathed a quick prayer that life might be long". Later, she heads back downstairs, only to witness Brently coming home. Her joy turns to shock at the sight of her husband and she dies from a heart attack as a result.

Characters
Louise Mallard: She is the wife of Brently Mallard. She also suffers from a heart disease which is mentioned in the beginning of the story. She grieves her husband's death after finding out from her sister Josephine that he tragically died in a railroad accident. Although she is upset and grieves him at first, she comes to realize that she now has her freedom to live her life only for herself.
Brently Mallard: He is the husband to Louise Mallard. He is believed to be dead at the start of the story. Only after Louise starts to feel overjoyed with her new freedom is when he returns home not knowing he was believed to be dead and then Louise dies from "the joy that kills".
Josephine: She is the sister of Louise Mallard and consoles her after Brently's friend Richard informs Louise about Brently Mallard's death. 
Richards:  He is Brently Mallard's friend and was the one to learn of Brently's death and inform Josephine, Louise's sister, about it.

Critical responses

In Unveiling Kate Chopin, Emily Toth argues that Chopin "had to have her heroine die" in order to make the story publishable. In a 2020 article, Cihan Yazgı provides a different perspective on why Chopin had to let Louise Mallard die at the end and analyses her death as a part of the story's tragic plot. Drawing upon the Aristotelian formula and supporting his reading with stylistic evidence from the text, Yazgı argues that it is possible to understand the story's plot in terms of classical tragic elements of anagnorisis, peripeteia and catastrophe. He states that Chopin's reliance on these tragic elements in structuring her plot, helps Chopin to attain sympathy for Mrs. Mallard and to have her readership reflect with a critical eye on gender politics; this might not have been possible without the tragic plot. Meanwhile, Yazgı uses textual evidence to emphasize Chopin's stylistic mastery in creating a language that "reveal[s] in half concealing," which makes these tragic elements achieve their intended effects: The delaying of information creates a feeling of suspense and anticipation that eventually makes Mrs. Mallard's anagnorisis and catastrophe the more striking in such a short text.

Bert Bender, an English professor at Arizona State University, offers a biographical reading of the text and argues that writing of the 1890s was influenced by Charles Darwin's theory of sexual selection. Chopin's understanding of the meaning of love and courtship, in particular, was altered and became more pessimistic. This attitude finds its expression in "The Story of an Hour" when Mrs. Mallard questions the meaning of love and ultimately rejects it as meaningless.

Lawrence I. Berkove, a professor at the University of Michigan-Dearborn, notes that there has been "virtual critical agreement" that the story is about female liberation from a repressive marriage. However, he contests this reading and argues that there is a "deeper level of irony in the story". He proposes that there is an underlying irony where Louise is not depicted as a “heroine”, but instead as an “egotist and a victim of her own extreme self assertion”.  Berkove also points out that Louise puts love after her own self-assertion and how it is peculiar a married person would think like this. He also dives deeper into how Louise wanted to "live for herself", and although there is no evidence in the text that she had sacrificed anything for her husband, it can be interpreted by the reader that Louise did not have much freedom. Berkove considers what life actually has to offer for people like Louise when constricted of freedom. He proposes that since she had "unrealistic expectations of absolute freedom" and "dissatisfaction with the best life has to offer", the only other option for Louise was death. He challenges the notion that Chopin intended for the views of the story's main character to coincide with those of the author. Xuding Wang has criticized Berkove's interpretation.

In her article, "Emotions in 'The Story of An Hour", Selina Jamil argues that Chopin portrays Mrs. Mallard's perception of her husband's supposed death as fostered by emotions, rather than by rationality. Jamil claims that up until that point, Mrs. Mallard's life has been devoid of emotion to such an extent that she has even wondered if it is worth living. The repression of emotion may represent Mrs. Mallard's repressive husband, who had, up until that point, "smothered" and "silenced" her will. Therefore, her newfound freedom is brought on by an influx of emotion (representing the death of her repressive husband) that adds meaning and value to her life. Although Mrs. Mallard initially feels fear when she hears of her husband's death, the strength of the emotion is so powerful that Mrs. Mallard actually feels joy (because she can realize her newfound freedoms). Since this "joy that kills" ultimately leads to Mrs. Mallard's death, one possible interpretation is that the repression of Mrs. Mallard's feelings is what killed her in the end.

In the same article, Jamil shows the repression that Mrs. Mallard faces as a wife. She realizes after her husband's apparent death that she is "free, free, free". This shows how her life would change and that she is now a new person, removed from the repressed life she faced before. No evidence is given in the story about how she is repressed, but her reaction to his death and her newfound confidence and freedom are enough. This repression of herself, that she dealt with, has now been removed with the death of her husband, enabling her to be free.  Jamil additionally accuses patriarchy for repressing Louise's emotions. Jamil argues that Mrs. Mallard was "[oblivious] to the beauty of life" due to her marriage. It is only after she is free from the bonds of patriarchy, insinuated by the death of her husband, is she able to feel a medley of emotions.

In a 2004 article, author Mark Cunningham explores the reason behind Mrs. Mallard's death at the end of the story. Many critics argue that she died from seeing her husband alive or her heart disease. However, Cunningham argues that "[T]he evidence of the story indicates that Louise dies not from grief at Brently's return, but from the emotional and spiritual strain that the news of his death occasions".

In a 2013 article, Jeremy Foote, a researcher at Purdue University, argues that "The Story of an Hour" can be read as a commentary and warning about technology—specifically the railroad and the telegraph. The railroad, he claims, may be the cause of the distance between the Mallards (and many other couples of the time). It allowed for work and home to be very distant from each other, and eliminated opportunities for spouses to spend time together. Foote argues that the reason that Louise Mallard wanted more autonomy was because she and her husband did not spend time together. The alone time that Louise had in the house made her less close to her husband, and made her want her independence.

While most readers infer Kate Chopin's "The Story of an Hour" is about the awakening of feminine awareness and the struggle for freedom in a man's world, Li Chongyue and Wang Lihua offer a new analysis. They conclude that Mrs. Mallard is an ungrateful and unfaithful wife. Chopin provides little background on both Mr. and Mrs. Mallard. However, there's enough evidence to assume they live a comfortable life. For example, the two-story home, the "comfortable" and "roomy" armchairs, and how one armchair sat "facing the open window". When it comes to the topic of the female awakening, Tseng contributes the main character's awakening to a phenomenon by the name of "Jouissance".

In the article, Chongyue and Lihua point out how Brently Mallard loved his wife, but she didn't feel the same. Mr. Mallard was often away from home on business trips to provide for his wife. Meanwhile, Louise only loved him "sometimes" and "often she had not loved him". 
Instead of a loving, ill wife, Mrs. Mallard is actually seen as ungrateful and unfaithful to her husband. Chongyue and Lihua conclude that such a woman cannot live on this earth, therefore, causing her death. 

When she hears of her husband's death, Mrs. Mallard weeps in her sister's arms. Her reaction could be seen as genuine and coming from a place of pain. However, a second look could suggest that these are tears of joy. She was "pressed down by a physical exhaustion that haunted her body and seemed to reach her soul" simply because she was tired of her life and needed a change. After emerging from her room following the news of her husband, "she carried herself unwittingly like a goddess of Victory."

In an article written in 2004, Mark Cunningham argues that Louise Mallard's death was not caused because of her excitement or her sadness of her husband's passing. He argues that Louise Mallard dies after the "adrenaline rush of her shock" wore off and that her dying when her husband returns "is more ironic than melodramatic." Cunningham discusses in his article that with the new found freedom Mrs. Mallard received, she has "[lost] any place for her in male dominated society." and that there is no society were she will have a place.

Film adaptation
In 1984, director Tina Rathbone released a film adaptation of the story titled The Joy That Kills. This film is based on Kate Chopin's story, "The Story of an Hour". The main character, portrayed by Frances Conroy, also suffers from a heart condition, just like Louise Mallard does. This production is mostly concerned with the psychological state of the main character.

References

External links

 

1894 short stories
Feminist short stories
Short stories by Kate Chopin
Short stories adapted into films
Works originally published in Vogue (magazine)